Alicia Froling (born 31 January 1996) is an Australian professional basketball player.

Career

College
Froling plays college basketball at Southern Methodist University in Dallas, Texas for the SMU Mustangs.

WNBL
Born and raised in Townsville, Froling would begin her WNBL career in her home town, signed as a development player alongside her twin sister, with the Townsville Fire for the 2011–12 WNBL season. Froling remained a member of the Fire's roster through to 2014. She then departed to begin her college career in the United States.

In 2019, Froling was set to return to the league after several years away, signing with the Bendigo Spirit for the 2019–20 season. However, this was soon cut short after an injury and subsequent surgery cancelled her plans for the season.

In August 2020, Froling confirmed she would finally return to the WNBL, set to make her debut with the Bendigo Spirit in the condensed 2020 hub season in her native North Queensland.

National Team

Youth Level
Froling first played for Australia at the 2011 FIBA Oceania Under-16 Championship for Women where she took home Gold. She would then go on to participate in the world championship in Amsterdam, Netherlands where Australia placed 5th. Froling would also go on to play for the Gems at two world championships, bringing home a bronze medal on both occasions.

Personal life
Froling has a twin sister, Keely who is also a professional basketball player. She played alongside her in Townsville, SMU and the U17 National team. Their younger brothers, Harry and Sam, have also represented Australia internationally.

References

1996 births
Living people
Forwards (basketball)
Australian women's basketball players
Universiade medalists in basketball
Universiade gold medalists for Australia
Medalists at the 2019 Summer Universiade
20th-century Australian women
21st-century Australian women